Anthony Knyvett may refer to:

 Anthony Knivet, the pirate, slave and slave trader
 Anthony Knyvett (Black Rod) ( 1486 to 1549), held the office of Black Rod in the English Parliament
 Anthony Knyvett (1507–1554), Lieutenant of the Tower of London and Governor of Portsmouth, executed after Wyatt's Rebellion